A senatorial election in the Philippines was held on November 8, 1955. This was a midterm election, the date when the winners took office falling halfway through President Ramon Magsaysay's  four-year term.

Summary
Since Magsaysay was very popular midway through his term, there were 10 candidates who ran under the Nacionalista banner.  His adoptive Nacionalista Party continued to grow in strength with the absorption of their erstwhile coalition partner, the Democratic Party; but a pillar of the NP could not hide his opposition to the president. Senator Claro M. Recto, one of those who actively sought the adoption of the former Defense Secretary into the NP fold in 1953, had grown critical of Magsaysay, calling him a “banana dictator” and “American puppet,” among other unflattering names. In retaliation, Magsaysay refused the inclusion of Recto into the NP Senate slate of 1955, prompting the Batangueño leader to seek support for his candidacy with the Liberals.

Though Lorenzo Tañada of the NCP had cooperated with the NP in 1953, Recto became the first “guest candidate” in Philippine electoral history, when he was included in the Liberal Party lineup but did not resign his membership as a Nacionalista.

Special elections
There was a special election held for the vacant seat of Senator Carlos P. Garcia after he won as Vice President in 1953. Roseller T. Lim won and served the unexpired term of Garcia from 1955 to 1957.

Retiring incumbents

Liberal Party
Tomas Cabili
Justiniano Montano

Mid-term vacancy
Esteban Abada (Liberal), died on December 17, 1954

Results
The Nacionalista Party won all eight seats contested in the general election, and won the one seat contested in the special election.

Nacionalistas Quintin Paredes, Claro M. Recto, Lorenzo Sumulong both defended their Senate seats. Paredes and Sumulong were former Liberals who ran as Nacionalistas in this election. The two Liberal senators who defended their seats were defeated: Enrique Magalona and Macario Peralta.

Five winners are neophyte Nacionalista senators: Decoroso Rosales, Domocao Alonto, Francisco Soc Rodrigo, Pacita Madrigal-Warns, and Pedro Sabido. Madrigal-Warns became the only woman in the Senate.

Key:
 ‡ Seats up
 + Gained by a party from another party
 √ Held by the incumbent
 * Held by the same party with a new senator
^ Vacancy

Per candidate (general election)

Special election 
For Carlos P. Garcia's vacated Senate seat when he was elected vice president on 1953. Unlike the regular election, this is held under the first past the post system.

Per party
This includes the result of the special election under "seats after," but not on other columns.

See also
Commission on Elections
3rd Congress of the Philippines

References

External links
 Official website of the Commission on Elections

1955
Senate election